is a former Japanese football player.

Playing career
Aratani was born in Takaoka on August 6, 1975. After graduating from high school, he joined J1 League club Urawa Reds in 1994. However he could not play at all in the match behind Hisashi Tsuchida and Yuki Takita. In 1998, he moved to Japan Football League club Kawasaki Frontale. However he could not play at all in the match behind Takeshi Urakami. In 1999, he moved to Omiya Ardija. Although he could not play at all in the match behind Atsushi Shirai until 2001, he debuted in 2002. Although he could not play at all in the match behind Eiji Kawashima in 2003, he became a regular goalkeeper after Kawashima left the club in 2004. In 2004, the club won the 2nd place and was promoted to J1. However he lost his position behind Koji Ezumi for injury in 2007 and he could not play at all in the match in 2008. In 2009, he moved to J2 club Consadole Sapporo. Although he played many matches in 2009 season, he resigned and moved to J2 club Ventforet Kofu in 2010. The club won the 2nd place in 2010 and was promoted to J1 from 2011. He retired end of 2011 season.

Club statistics

References

External links

1975 births
Living people
Association football people from Toyama Prefecture
Japanese footballers
J1 League players
J2 League players
Japan Football League (1992–1998) players
Urawa Red Diamonds players
Kawasaki Frontale players
Omiya Ardija players
Hokkaido Consadole Sapporo players
Ventforet Kofu players
Association football goalkeepers